Marshalltown is a rural community located just west of Digby,  There was once an almshouse and poor farm. Marshalltown was the birthplace of Samuel Ogden Edison Jr, father of Thomas Edison (1847-1931), and it was also the home of folk artist Maud Lewis (1903-1970) from 1938 until her death. Her small decorated house is preserved at the Art Gallery of Nova Scotia in Halifax while a steel memorial sculpture inspired by the house has been erected at the original site in Marshalltown. A replica of the house and interior is located a few kilometres north of Marshalltown on the road to Digby Neck.

References

Marshalltown on Destination Nova Scotia

Communities in Digby County, Nova Scotia